Ville Jansson (born 10 April 1965) is a former professional tennis player from Sweden.

Biography
Born in Timrå, Jansson grew up in the town of Värnamo.

Prior to touring professionally he played collegiate tennis for Northeast Louisiana University. He earned All-American honours in 1986 and graduated in 1988.

From 1989 he joined the professional circuit, where he competed for two years. He beat Chris Pridham to win a Challenger tournament in Coquitlam in 1989, in addition to three Challenger titles he won in doubles. In 1990 he appeared in the main draw of the men's doubles at the Australian Open, French Open and US Open.

Since retiring he has lived mostly in Texas. In 2017 he became the Director of Sports at Lost Creek Country Club in Austin, Texas.

Challenger titles

Singles: (1)

Doubles: (3)

References

External links
 
 

1965 births
Living people
Swedish male tennis players
People from Värnamo Municipality
Louisiana–Monroe Warhawks men's tennis players
Swedish emigrants to the United States
Sportspeople from Jönköping County